Bogert is a German surname. Notable people with the surname include:

Charles Mitchill Bogert (1908–1992), American herpetologist
Frank Bogert (1910–2009), American politician
George Henry Bogert (1864–1944), American landscape painter
Howard Z. Bogert (1935–2003) US-American electronic-engineer, worked at General Micro-electronics (GM-e)
Margot Bogert
Marston T. Bogert (1868–1954), American chemist
Tim Bogert (1944–2021), American bass guitar player
Victor van den Bogert (born 1999), Dutch footballer
William Bogert (1936–2020), American character actor